Jovon Toppin (born January 2, 1989 in Port of Spain) is a Trinidadian sprinter, who specialized in the 400 metres. Toppin competed for the men's 4 × 400 m relay at the 2008 Summer Olympics in Beijing, along with his teammates Ato Modibo, Cowin Mills, and Stann Waithe. He ran on the second leg of the second heat, with an individual-split time of 45.92 seconds. Toppin and his team finished the relay in fifth place, for a seasonal best time of 3:04.12, failing to advance into the final.

References

External links

TTOC Profile
NBC 2008 Olympics profile

1989 births
Living people
Trinidad and Tobago male sprinters
Olympic athletes of Trinidad and Tobago
Athletes (track and field) at the 2008 Summer Olympics
Sportspeople from Port of Spain